Carlos Manuel Ribeiro Freitas (born 20 January 1994 in Guimarães) is a Portuguese footballer who plays for AD Fafe as a defender.

Football career
On 31 July 2016, Freitas made his professional debut with Olhanense in a 2016–17 Taça da Liga match against Varzim.

References

External links

Stats and profile at LPFP 

1994 births
Living people
Sportspeople from Guimarães
Portuguese footballers
Association football defenders
F.C. Felgueiras 1932 players
S.C. Olhanense players
S.C. Freamunde players
Juventude de Pedras Salgadas players
AD Fafe players
Liga Portugal 2 players